Clear was an American CCM group from Cambridge, Minnesota.

Clear formed in the summer of 1997 and released two albums on Ardent Records, in 1998 and 2000. Their 2000 release Follow the Narrow hit #33 on the Billboard Top Contemporary Christian Albums chart in 2000. The group split up early in 2001.

Members
Matt Berry - vocals, guitar, mandolin
Nate Larson - guitar
Peter Sanders - drums
Alison (Ali) Ogren - vocals, piano
David Caton - vocals, bass, didgeridoo

Discography
Clear (Ardent Records, 1998)
Follow the Narrow (Ardent, 2000)

References

External links
 Ardent Records

Musical groups from Minnesota
Musical groups established in 1997
American Christian musical groups
Musical groups disestablished in 2001